Tetraopes ineditus is a species of beetle in the family Cerambycidae. It was described by Chemsak and Giesbert in 1986. It is known from Mexico.

References

Tetraopini
Beetles described in 1986